Pseudocatharylla albiceps is a moth of the family Crambidae. It is found in Sri Lanka.

References

Moths described in 1912
Crambinae